daydream is the fourth studio album released by Aimer. It was released in three versions: a limited CD+Blu-ray (Type-A), a limited CD+DVD edition (Type-B), and a regular CD only edition. The song "Falling Alone" was used as the lead track and was previously released as her 10th digital single as advance of the album

The album charted #2 daily rank for first week. It charted so far 34 weeks and sold more than 78,000 copies. The album was certified Gold by Recording Industry Association of Japan in March 2017 for shipment of 100,000 copies.

Track listing

Credits 
Adapted from Booklet.

Production 
Aimer  – producer (tracks 1, 10, 11)
Colin Brittain – programming, recording engineer, mixing engineer (tracks 1, 10, 11)
Dick Beetham – mastering engineer (track 6)
Fumiaki Unehara – assistant recording engineer (track 12)
Hideki Kodera – recording engineer (track 5)
Hideki Morioka – director, organizer (tracks 3, 4, 5, 7, 13)
Hiroshi Hiranuma – recording engineer, mixing engineer (tracks 8, 9)
Hiroyuki Sawano  – producer (track 2)
Keisuke Narita – assistant recording engineer (track 2)
Kenji Tamai  – producer (tracks 3, 4, 5, 7, 13)
Kouzou Miyamoto – assistant recording engineer (track 2)
Jamil Kazmi – director, organizer (tracks 1, 4, 10, 11, 13)
Masahiro Tobinai – programming (tracks 3, 7)
Masaki Mori - recording engineer (tracks 3, 4, 5, 7, 13), mixing engineer (track 5)
Masayoshi Sugai – recording engineer, mixing engineer (track 6)
Mitsunori Aizawa - recording engineer, mixing engineer, Pro Tools operator (track 2)
Rui Momota – programming (track 4)
Satoshi Kumasaka – mixing engineer (tracks 3, 4, 7, 13)
Shogo Ohnishi – programming (tracks 5, 13)
SukimaSwitch – producer (track 8)
Takahiro Moriuchi  – producer (tracks 1, 10, 11)
Takahito Uchisawa  –  producer, programming (tracks 3, 4)
Ted Jensen – mastering engineer (track 12)
Tetsuro Sawamoto – assistant engineer (track 6)
TK  – producer, recording engineer, mixing engineer (tracks 9, 12), mastering engineer (track 9), programming (track 12)
Yasushi Horiguchi – director (track 2)
Yojiro Noda – producer (track 6)
Yoshikazu Nagai – recording engineer (track 3, 7)
Yuji Chinone – mastering engineer (track 1~5, 7, 8, 10, 11, 13)

Musicians 
Aimer – lead vocals (all tracks), handclaps (track 8)
BOBO – drums (track 12)
chelly – additional vocals (track 2)
Colin Brittain – all instruments (tracks 1, 10, 11)
Ichiro Yoshida – bass (track 3)
Hanaregumi – guitar, chorus (track 6)
Harutoshi Ito – guitar (track 2)
Hiroo Yamaguchi – bass (tracks 9, 12)
Hiroyuki Sawano – piano, keyboards, other instruments (track 2)
Honoka Satou – strings (track 12)
Katsuhiro Mafune – bass (track 6)
Mao Abe – additional vocals (track 5)
Makiko Amemiya strings – strings (track 9)
Mamiko Hirai – piano (track 9)
Masahiro Tobinai – other instruments (tracks 3, 7)
Masami Horisawa – strings (track 12)
Mikiyo Kikuchi – strings (track 12)
Takahito Uchisawa – chorus, guitar, other instruments (track 3, 7)
Takeshi Taneda – bass (track 6)
Takuya Ohashi – chorus, guitar, handclaps (track 8)
TK – chorus (track 12), guitar (tracks 9, 12)
Tom Tamada – drums (tracks 8, 9)
Toshino Tanabe – bass (track 2)
Rui Momota – guitar, other instruments (track 4)
Shintaro Tokita – chorus, handclaps, piano, other instruments (track 8)
Shogo Ohnishi – guitar (track 13), other instruments (track 5, 13)
Susumu Nishikawa – guitar (track 8)
Yojiro Noda – piano, chorus (track 6)
Yu "masshoi" Yamauchi – drums (track 2)
Yuko Araki – drums (track 6)

Album Staff 
Arata Kato – photograph
Daisuke Katsurada – executive producer
Go Matsuda – art direction & design
Hiroaki Sano – supervise
Jun Yamaguchi – products coordination
Kenji Tamai – executive producer
Kenkichi Fukahara – artist management
Mami Fujino – artist management
Minaho Takahashi – hair & makeup
Takeshi Tomaru – a&r
Yasuhisa Ichikawa – artist management
Yuuka Akashi – styling

Charts

Album

Singles

Sales and certifications

Awards

References

External links
 Album Special Website (Japanese)
  daydream Aimer on agehasprings
 daydream Aimer on quia
 316 Aimer "daydream" on Arata Kato Photography
 
 
 daydream / Aimer  on VGMdb

Aimer albums
2016 albums
Japanese-language albums
SME Records albums